Grandam may refer to:
 grandparent
 Grand-Am, an auto racing sanctioning body established in 1999 to organize road racing competitions in North America
 Grande dame, a stock character, usually an elderly high-society socialite